Firebrands of Arizona is a 1944 American Western film directed by Lesley Selander and written by Randall Faye. The film stars Smiley Burnette, Sunset Carson, Peggy Stewart, Earle Hodgins, Roy Barcroft and LeRoy Mason. The film was released on December 1, 1944, by Republic Pictures.

Plot

Cast  
Smiley Burnette as Frog / Beefsteak Discoe
Sunset Carson as Sunset Carson
Peggy Stewart as Poppy Calhoun
Earle Hodgins as Sheriff Hoag
Roy Barcroft as Deputy Ike
LeRoy Mason as P. T. Bailey
Tom London as Wagon-Driving Farmer
Jack Kirk as Henchman Memphis
Bud Geary as Henchman Slugs
Rex Lease as Deputy Mike
Grace Cunard as Woman in Bank (uncredited)

See also
List of American films of 1944

References

External links 
 

1944 films
1940s English-language films
American Western (genre) films
1944 Western (genre) films
Republic Pictures films
Films directed by Lesley Selander
American black-and-white films
1940s American films